FC Leones is an association football team in Ponce, Puerto Rico that plays in the Puerto Rico Soccer League. Their debut took place during the 2011 season, in which they placed second during the regular season and later, during the Playoffs Cup, became the 2011 PRSL champions.

Also classified for the CFU Clubs Championship.

Players 2011
Player

Sources:

Awards
2011  Puerto Rico Soccer League First Division Regular Season - Runner Up
 Mauricio Salles - (PRSL) Scorer Golden Boot
2011  Puerto Rico Soccer League First Division Post Season - Champions
 Leo Tillemont - (PRSL) MVP Golden Ball

Record

Year-by-year

References

External links
Press Release
Official PRSL Site

Association football clubs established in 2011
Football clubs in Puerto Rico
Puerto Rico Soccer League teams
2011 establishments in Puerto Rico
Sports teams in Ponce, Puerto Rico